Gradiščak is a small settlement in the Municipality of Juršinci in northeastern Slovenia. It lies on the western edge of the Slovene Hills, just east of Dragovič. The area is part of the traditional region of Styria. It is now included with the rest of the municipality in the Drava Statistical Region.

References

External links
Gradiščak on Geopedia

Populated places in the Municipality of Juršinci